Paul "Scrap Iron" Ryan (born , in Dublin) is an Irish professional light welter/welter/light middleweight boxer of the 1990s who won the World Boxing Organization (WBO) Inter-Continental light welterweight title, British Boxing Board of Control (BBBofC) British light welterweight title, and Commonwealth light welterweight title, and was a challenger for the BBBofC British welterweight title against Geoff McCreesh, his professional fighting weight varied from , i.e. light welterweight to , i.e. light middleweight.

References

External links

Image - Paul Ryan

1965 births
English male boxers
Light-middleweight boxers
Light-welterweight boxers
Living people
People from Kent
Boxers from Greater London
Welterweight boxers